Krish  can refer to :

 Krish, an alternate name for Krishna
 Krish (singer), an Indian film singer
 Krish (director), a South Indian film director
 John Krish (1923–2016), British film director